Yasmine Al-Bustami is an American actress. She is most known for her roles on The Originals and NCIS: Hawai'i.

Early life
Yasmine Al-Bustami was born in Abu Dhabi, United Arab Emirates, to a Palestinian-Jordanian father and Filipina mother, but moved with her family to Texas at the age of three. After receiving a degree in Finance, she decided to enter the world of entertainment, and improved her studies in Chicago, Illinois.

Career
In 2013, Al-Bustami made her television debut in The Originals as the recurring role of Monique Deveraux, a season one villain.

In 2014, she guest starred in a season 3 episode of Nashville playing the role of Delissa Birch.

In 2015, Al-Bustami guest starred in a season 4 episode of Switched at Birth.

In 2016-2017, she had a recurring role on season 2 of The Inspectors. In 2017 she appeared in the music video of John Legend's single, "Surefire." Al-Bustami also had a role in the feature film You Get Me. She was a series regular in the CW Seed series I Ship It playing Sasha.

In 2018, Al-Bustami was cast as a series regular in the Alpha streaming service live interactive sci-fi series Orbital Redux playing the role of Tommie.

In 2019, season 2 of I Ship It was released with Al-Bustami back as Sasha. The season premiered again on CW Seed, but also premiered this time on The CW.

In 2021, she reprised the role of Ramah in multiple episodes of The Chosens second season and third season, after appearing in a season one episode in 2019. She was also cast as a series regular in NCIS spin-off NCIS: Hawaii playing the role of Special Agent Lucy Tara.

Filmography

References

External links
 
 

21st-century American actresses
Living people
American child actresses
American film actresses
American people of Emirati descent
American people of Palestinian descent
American people of Jordanian descent
American people of Filipino descent
American television actresses
Emirati emigrants to the United States
People from Abu Dhabi
People from Dallas
Year of birth missing (living people)